Courtaulds Ground was a cricket ground in Coventry, Warwickshire.  The ground was owned by Courtaulds.  The first recorded match on the ground was in 1949, when it hosted its first first-class match between Warwickshire and Hampshire in the County Championship.  From 1949 to 1982, the ground played host to 56 first-class matches, the last of which was between Warwickshire and Middlesex.

The ground also hosted List-A matches, the first of which was between Warwickshire and Leicestershire in the 1972 Benson and Hedges Cup.  From 1972 to 1983, the ground held 8 List-A matches, the last of which was between Warwickshire and Derbyshire in the 1983 John Player Special League.

Today the ground is no longer used for cricket and is in a desperate state of disrepair.  The pavilion, built at a cost of £15,000 in 1935, is itself derelict and the outfield overgrown.

References

External links
Courtaulds Ground on CricketArchive
Courtaulds Ground on Cricinfo

Defunct cricket grounds in England
Sports venues in Coventry
Cricket grounds in the West Midlands (county)
Defunct sports venues in the West Midlands (county)
Sports venues completed in 1946